Dubréka is a town in Guinea, lying immediately north of Conakry.
Population 8,300 (2008 est).

Overview 

As the birthplace of president Lansana Conté, it has a good infrastructure and is also known for its mangrove swamps.

Transport 

It has a station on a 1000mm gauge railway that carries bauxite from Fria.

References 

Sub-prefectures of the Kindia Region